The Magritte Award for Best Actor is an award presented annually by the Académie André Delvaux. It is given in honor of an actor who has delivered an outstanding performance in a leading role while working within the film industry. It is one of the Magritte Awards, which were established to recognize excellence in Belgian cinematic achievements.

The 1st Magritte Awards ceremony was held in 2011 with Jonathan Zaccaï receiving the award for his role in Private Lessons. As of the 2022 ceremony, Jean Le Peltier is the most recent winner in this category for his role in Madly in Life.

Winners and nominees
In the list below, winners are listed first in the colored row, followed by the other nominees.

2010s
{| class="wikitable" width="95%" cellpadding="5"
|-
! width="100"|Year
! width="300"|Actor
! width="300"|English title
! width="300"|Original title
|-
|rowspan="4" style="text-align:center;"| 2010(1st) ||style="background:#B0C4DE;"| Jonathan Zaccaï ||style="background:#B0C4DE;"| Private Lessons ||style="background:#B0C4DE;"| Élève libre
|-
|  || The Barons || Les Barons
|-
| Olivier Gourmet || Angel at Sea || Un ange à la mer
|-
| Thierry Hancisse || The Boat Race || La Régate
|-
|rowspan="4" style="text-align:center;"| 2011(2nd) ||style="background:#B0C4DE;"| Matthias Schoenaerts ||style="background:#B0C4DE;"| Bullhead ||style="background:#B0C4DE;"| Rundskop
|-
| Dominique Abel || The Fairy || La Fée
|-
| Benoît Poelvoorde || Romantics Anonymous || Les Émotifs anonymes
|-
| Jonathan Zaccaï || A Distant Neighborhood || Quartier lointain
|-
|rowspan="4" style="text-align:center;"| 2012(3rd) ||style="background:#B0C4DE;"| Olivier Gourmet ||style="background:#B0C4DE;"| The Minister ||style="background:#B0C4DE;"| L'Exercice de l'État
|-
| Benoît Poelvoorde ||colspan="2"| Le grand soir
|-
| Jérémie Renier || My Way || Cloclo
|-
| Matthias Schoenaerts || Rust and Bone || De rouille et d'os
|-
|rowspan="4" style="text-align:center;"| 2013(4th) ||style="background:#B0C4DE;"| Benoît Poelvoorde ||style="background:#B0C4DE;"| A Place on Earth ||style="background:#B0C4DE;"| Une place sur la Terre
|-
| François Damiens ||rowspan="2" colspan="2"| Tango libre
|-
| 
|-
| Sam Louwyck || The Fifth Season || La Cinquième Saison
|-
|rowspan="4" style="text-align:center;"| 2014(5th) ||style="background:#B0C4DE;"| Fabrizio Rongione ||style="background:#B0C4DE;"| Two Days, One Night ||style="background:#B0C4DE;"| Deux jours, une nuit
|-
| François Damiens || Playing Dead || Je fais le mort
|-
| Bouli Lanners || Lulu in the Nude || Lulu femme nue
|-
| Benoît Poelvoorde || Scouting for Zebras || Les Rayures du zèbre
|-
|rowspan="4" style="text-align:center;"| 2015(6th) ||style="background:#B0C4DE;"|  ||style="background:#B0C4DE;"| I'm Dead but I Have Friends ||style="background:#B0C4DE;"| Je suis mort mais j'ai des amis
|-
| François Damiens ||colspan="2"| La Famille Bélier
|-
| Bouli Lanners || All Cats Are Grey || Tous les chats sont gris
|-
| Jérémie Renier || The Wakhan Front || Ni le ciel ni la terre
|-
|rowspan="4" style="text-align:center;"| 2016(7th) ||style="background:#B0C4DE;"|  ||style="background:#B0C4DE;"|  Death by Death ||style="background:#B0C4DE;"| Je me tue à le dire
|-
|| Aboubakr Bensaihi ||colspan="2"| Black
|-
| François Damiens ||colspan="2"| Les Cowboys
|-
| Bouli Lanners || The First, the Last || Les Premiers, les Derniers
|-
|rowspan="4" style="text-align:center;"| 2017(8th) ||style="background:#B0C4DE;"| Peter Van den Begin ||style="background:#B0C4DE;" colspan="2"| King of the Belgians
|-
|| François Damiens || Just to Be Sure || Ôtez-moi d'un Doute
|-
|| Jérémie Renier ||colspan="2"| L'Amant double
|-
|| Matthias Schoenaerts || Racer and the Jailbird || Le Fidèle
|-
|rowspan="4" style="text-align:center;"| 2018(9th) ||style="background:#B0C4DE;"| Victor Polster ||style="background:#B0C4DE;" colspan="2"| Girl
|-
|| François Damiens ||colspan="2"|  Mon Ket'|-
|| Olivier Gourmet || Above the Law || Tueurs|-
|| Benoît Poelvoorde || Keep an Eye Out || Au poste!|-
|rowspan="4" style="text-align:center;"| 2019(10th) ||style="background:#B0C4DE;"| Bouli Lanners ||style="background:#B0C4DE;"| Real Love ||style="background:#B0C4DE;"| C'est ça l'amour|-
|| Kevin Janssens || Patrick || De Patrick|-
|| Benoît Poelvoorde || Sink or Swim || Le Grand Bain|-
|| Marc Zinga || The Mercy of the Jungle || La Miséricorde de la Jungle|}

2020s

References

External links
 Magritte Awards official website
 Magritte Award for Best Actor at AlloCiné''

2011 establishments in Belgium
Awards established in 2011
Film awards for lead actor
Actor